The Genevois is a former province of the Duchy of Savoy. Its capital is Annecy and other centres include Faverges, Thônes, and La Clusaz. It was bordered by the provinces of Carouge to the north-west, Faucigny to the north-east, and Savoy proper to the south-east and south-west.

Although the province took its name from the city of Geneva, the Counts of Geneva were never able to exercise their authority in the city itself, which was ruled by the Bishops of Geneva. The County of Geneva, having passed to the de Thoire et Villars family on the death of Count Robert (the Avignon Pope Clement VII) in 1394, was sold in 1401 to the Counts of Savoy. It was subsequently conceded in appanage to several Savoyard princes before being joined to the Duchy of Savoy in 1659.

See also
List of the Counts of Geneva

History of Savoy
1659 establishments in the Holy Roman Empire
Duchy of Savoy